Hamza El-Gamal is a retired Egyptian footballer.

Career
El-Gamal played club football for Ismaily.

He was also part of the Egypt national football team at the 1994 African Cup of Nations.

References

External links

Living people
Egyptian footballers
Egyptian football managers
Ismaily SC players
1994 African Cup of Nations players
1996 African Cup of Nations players
1970 births
Smouha SC managers
Egyptian Premier League players
Association football defenders
Al Mokawloon Al Arab SC managers
Egypt international footballers
People from Monufia Governorate